The 1974 European Karate Championships, the 7th edition of the European Karate Championships, was held in London, England, from May 2 to 4, 1974.

Competition

Team

References

1974
International sports competitions in London
European Karate Championships
European championships in 1974
European Karate Championships
European Karate Championships
Karate competitions in the United Kingdom